Karate is a video game for the Atari 2600 originally published by Ultravision in 1982 for NTSC systems, then re-released in the latter half of the 1980s by Froggo. Supposedly the game was designed by black belt Joseph Amelio. In 1991, Digital Press chose Karate as one of the worst Atari 2600 games of all time.

References

External links
Karate at Atari Mania
Karate at AtariAge

1982 video games
Atari 2600 games
Atari 2600-only games
Karate video games
Multiplayer video games
Fighting games
Video games developed in the United States